Banyon is a detective series broadcast in the United States by NBC as part of its 1972-73 television schedule, though a standalone two-hour television movie was broadcast first in March 1971. The series was a Quinn Martin Production (in association with Warner Bros. Television), the first-ever show Martin made for the NBC network, though he did not produce the pilot.

Banyon was a period drama set in the late 1930s in Los Angeles.  It concerned the life of private investigator Miles C. Banyon (Robert Forster), a tough-but-honest detective who would accept essentially any case for US$20/day.  Located in the same complex (the famed Bradbury Building) as Banyon's office was the secretarial school operated by Peggy Revere (Joan Blondell).  By an agreement between Banyon and Revere, part of the training provided to these young women was a period serving as Banyon's secretary; this gave him the advantage of not having to provide a salary for a secretary but meant that he never had the same one long enough for her to become a truly knowledgeable or reliable assistant.  Besides Revere, the other ongoing female character was Banyon's girlfriend, Abby Graham (Julie Gregg), a nightclub singer who was constantly trying to encourage him to "settle down" and marry her, but to no avail during the brief run of this series.  Banyon's police acquaintance with the Los Angeles Police Department was the cynical Lieutenant Pete McNeil (Richard Jaeckel).

Banyon was unable to find an adequate audience and lost in the Nielsen ratings to ABC's Love, American Style and movies on CBS and was canceled  midseason.  Despite the show's short life, Quentin Tarantino liked Forster's performance as the title character so much that he hired him for the feature film Jackie Brown many years later.

It is one of the few Quinn Martin shows not owned currently by Paramount Global; the series rights remain with Warner Bros. Discovery. It is also one of only two QM shows to bill a cast member above the title (the other is A Man Called Sloane, featuring Robert Conrad).

Episodes

References
Notes

Bibliography
Brooks, Tim and Marsh, Earle, The Complete Directory to Prime Time Network and Cable TV Shows

External links
 

NBC original programming
Neo-noir television series
1972 American television series debuts
1973 American television series endings
Television series by Warner Bros. Television Studios
American detective television series
Fictional portrayals of the Los Angeles Police Department
Television series set in the 1930s
Television shows set in Los Angeles
English-language television shows
Films scored by Laurence Rosenthal